Nella Frank Brown Pond (May 7, 1858 – September 14, 1893) was a dramatic reader.

Early life
Nella Frank Brown was born in Springfield, Massachusetts, on May 7, 1858. Her father, Dr. Enoch Brown, was an eminent physician of Springfield, for some years, and afterwards moved to New York, where he died, while Pond was quite young. The family then went to Middletown, Connecticut, and finally became permanent residents of Boston.

Career

Nella Brown Pond was an accomplished reader and stood in the front rank of the women of America who made their mark upon the platform.

In Boston Pond's natural dramatic talent became known to a few friends, who induced her to become a member of the Park Dramatic Company, an amateur organization of great excellence. She appeared for the first time as Margaret Elmore in Love's Sacrifice and achieved an instantaneous success. She remained with the company during that season, and her great dramatic talent secured for her a widespread popularity and won recognition from prominent professionals. She received numerous flattering offers from managers of leading metropolitan theaters, but refused them all, having conscientious scruples against going on the stage.

Mrs. Thomas Barry, then leading lady of the Boston Theater, became greatly interested in her and advised that she appear upon the lyceum platform as a reader, prophesying that she would become celebrated. Through Mrs. Barry's exertions an engagement was effected with the Redpath Lyceum Bureau, and Pond at once assumed a position and gained a popularity which successive seasons only served to intensify.

Personal life
In 1880 Nella Brown Pond became the wife of Ozias W. Pond, of Boston, a well-known manager of musical and literary celebrities. Her husband died in February, 1892.

She died on September 14, 1893, in Boston, from typhoid fever.

References

1858 births
1893 deaths
People from Springfield, Massachusetts
American actors
Wikipedia articles incorporating text from A Woman of the Century